Brookfield is a small dormitory village in west central Renfrewshire, Scotland. It lies on the north of the A761 road, which runs through a number of towns and villages to join Port Glasgow and the city of Glasgow, via Paisley, and is roughly equidistant to the nearby settlements of Houston, Bridge of Weir, Kilbarchan, Johnstone and Linwood.

History
The village was effectively founded in the late 19th century from what was previously farmland. It continued to grow at a steady rate from this point onwards, and now includes some 200 houses – making it possibly Renfrewshire's smallest village.

Brookfield was also home to Donald J Malcolm (1925-2003), founder of The Malcolm Group, a significant haulage contractor whose fleet carried the Brookfield name.

The village was also home to Merchiston Hospital.

Governance
For elections to Renfrewshire Council, Brookfield forms part of Ward 9 (Houston, Crosslee and Linwood).

References

Villages in Renfrewshire